Charles Swearinger Lewis (February 26, 1821 – January 22, 1878) was a U.S. Representative from Virginia.

Biography
Born in Clarksburg, Virginia (now West Virginia), Lewis attended local schools and Ohio University at Athens. He graduated from Augusta College in Kentucky in 1844. Lewis studied law and was  admitted to the bar in 1846. He began the practice of law in Clarksburg, Virginia.

Lewis served as member of the Virginia House of Delegates from 1849 until 1852. He was elected as a Democratic candidate to the Thirty-third Congress to fill the vacancy caused by the death of John F. Snodgrass, serving from  December 4, 1854, until March 3, 1855. He was an unsuccessful candidate for reelection in 1854 to the Thirty-fourth Congress.

After leaving Congress, Lewis resumed the practice of law in Clarksburg. He served as a delegate to the State constitutional convention in 1861, and served in the West Virginia House of Delegates in 1871.
He was State superintendent of free schools and adjutant general of the State of West Virginia from 1871 to 1872. He resigned upon his election as judge of the second judicial circuit and served until his death.

Lewis died on January 22, 1878, in Clarksburg, West Virginia. He is interred in Odd Fellows Cemetery.

References

External links
 

 
 The Political Graveyard

1821 births
1878 deaths
Politicians from Clarksburg, West Virginia
Virginia lawyers
West Virginia circuit court judges
Members of the Virginia House of Delegates
Democratic Party members of the West Virginia House of Delegates
West Virginia lawyers
Democratic Party members of the United States House of Representatives from Virginia
19th-century American politicians
19th-century American judges
19th-century American lawyers
Lawyers from Clarksburg, West Virginia
Augusta College (Kentucky) alumni